Podocarpus elatus, known as the plum pine, the brown pine or the Illawarra plum, is a species of Podocarpus endemic to the east coast of Australia, in eastern New South Wales and eastern Queensland.

It is a medium to large evergreen tree growing to 30–36 m tall with a trunk up to 1.5 m diameter. The leaves are lanceolate, 5–15 cm long (to 25 cm long on vigorous young trees) and 6–18 mm broad. The seed cones are dark blue-purple, berry-like, with a fleshy base 2-2.5 cm diameter bearing a single oval or globose seed 1 cm in diameter.

Uses
The fleshy part of the seed cone is edible, used in condiments. The timber was prized for furniture, joinery, boat planking, lining and piles in salt water. Podocarpus elatus is an attractive ornamental tree. In older Australian suburbs, the plum pine is used as an ornamental street tree, such as at Baldry Street, Chatswood.

Gallery

References

ANU Forestry Illawarra plum - Podocarpus elatus
 Bruneteau, Jean-Paul, Tukka, Real Australian Food, .
Dallimore, W., & Jackson, A. B. (1966). Handbook of Coniferae and Ginkgoaceae. Arnold.
Gymnosperm Database: Podocarpus elatus
 Low, Tim, Wild Food Plants of Australia, .
 Floyd, A.G., Rainforest Trees of Mainland South-eastern Australia, Inkata Press 1989, 

elatus
Flora of New South Wales
Flora of Queensland
Bushfood
Pinales of Australia
Trees of Australia
Least concern flora of Australia
Least concern biota of Queensland
Ornamental trees